Scorpions are a German rock band from Hanover, formed in 1965. The band went through numerous changes in personnel in its early years. Founding by rhythm guitarist Rudolf Schenker and drummer Wolfgang Dziony; both at that point shared lead vocals. In addition to them, the band also included lead guitarist Karl-Heinz Vollmer and bassist Achim Kirchhoff. 

By 1967, Schenker, realizing that he could not sing and play the guitar at the same time, invited the 15-year-old Werner Hoyer to take the place of the vocalist.

At the end of that year Hoyer and Vollmer left, and his place was soon taken by Bernd Hegner and Ulrich Worobiec.

In the spring of 1968 bass guitarist Achim Kirchhoff was replaced by Lothar Heimberg.

In late next, 1969 Hegner and Worobiec also left. After that the group settling on a lineup which included lead vocalist Klaus Meine, lead guitarist Michael Schenker (Rudolf's younger brother), bass-guitarist Lothar Heimberg and drummer Wolfgang Dziony. It is in this composition that they to record their debut album Lonesome Crow, released in 1972. 

Michael Schenker, Heimberg and Dziony all left after the album's release, with Rudolf Schenker and Meine briefly disbanding the group and joining Dawn Road, featuring guitarist Uli Jon Roth, bass-guitarist Francis Buchholz, drummer Jürgen Rosenthal and keyboardist Achim Kirschning; the six-piece later opted to adopt the Scorpions moniker, and in 1974 released Fly to the Rainbow.

Rosenthal left after the recording of Fly to the Rainbow, being replaced first by Jürgen Fechter and later by Rudy Lenners, who performed on In Trance and Virgin Killer. In 1977, Lenners was replaced by Herman Rarebell, whose first recording with the band was Taken by Force. Roth left Scorpions the following year, which he has since explained was because he "began getting dissatisfied with the direction of the music" the band were making. Michael Schenker briefly returned to the band after being fired from UFO in late 1978, performing on four tracks for the album Lovedrive, although he was replaced the following year by Matthias Jabs who had joined around the same time. The Scorpions lineup of Meine, Rudolf Schenker, Jabs, Buchholz and Rarebell remained constant from 1978 and through the 1980s.

After 19 years with the band, bassist Francis Buchholz left Scorpions in 1992. He was replaced by Ralph Rieckermann later in the year. Drummer Rarebell also left three years later, claiming that he was unsatisfied with the band's changing musical direction, and the lack of songwriting input he was able to have in the band. He was replaced in 1996 by James Kottak, after Curt Cress performed on Pure Instinct. Rieckermann left Scorpions in 2003, with Paweł Mąciwoda taking his place early the following year. Former Motörhead drummer Mikkey Dee replaced Kottak in the band in September 2016.

Members

Current

Former

Session

Timeline

Lineups

References

External links 
Scorpions official website

Scorpions